The 1906 Alabama Crimson White football team (variously "Alabama", "UA" or "Bama") represented the University of Alabama in the 1906 Southern Intercollegiate Athletic Association football season. It was Alabama's 14th overall and 11th season as a member of the Southern Intercollegiate Athletic Association (SIAA). The team was led by head coach J. W. H. Pollard, in his first year, and played their home games at both the University of Alabama Quad in Tuscaloosa and the Birmingham Fairgrounds in Birmingham, Alabama. They finished the season with a record of five wins and one loss (5–1 overall, 3–1 in the SIAA).

Schedule

Scoring note:

Season summary

Maryville

Alabama opened the 1906 season against Maryville College at Tuscaloosa, and defeated the Maryville Scots 6–0. In the game, the lone touchdown was scored in the first quarter on a ten-yard run by P. B. Jones.

Vanderbilt

Alabama's 78–0 loss to Vanderbilt still stands as the record for most points allowed by Alabama in a game and most lopsided Alabama loss. In the game, the Commodores led 57–0 at the half, and Alabama attempted to cancel this game after seven of their regular players were sidelined by injury  but Vanderbilt refused.

Auburn

Against Auburn, Pollard unveiled a "military shift" never before seen in the south. Star running back Auxford Burks scored all of the game's points in a 10–0 victory. Auburn contended Alabama player T. S. Sims was an illegal player.

Notes

References
General

 

Specific

Alabama
Alabama Crimson Tide football seasons
Alabama Crimson White football